Kongnathichai Boonma (born March 7, 1987) is a Thai professional footballer  who plays as an attacking midfielder for Thai League 2 club Nakhon Pathom United.

References

External links
 

1987 births
Living people
Kongnathichai Boonma
Association football midfielders
Kongnathichai Boonma
Kongnathichai Boonma
Kongnathichai Boonma
Kongnathichai Boonma